Zhu Jian'er (born Zhu Rong-shi, October 18, 1922 – August 15, 2017), courtesy name Zhu Pu-chen, was a Chinese symphonic composer and songwriter.

Biography
Zhu was born in Tianjin, China. In his early years, his grandfather moved his family to Shanghai. His family consisted of flour millers, and his father died when Zhu was three.

Out of admiration for Nie Er, Zhu Rong-shi changed his name to Zhu Jian'er.

He began composing in 1940 and pursued composition studies at the Moscow Conservatory in 1955. He was a professor at the Shanghai Conservatory. He composed for both Western and Chinese instruments and his works have been performed around the world. In 2000 he was commissioned by Yo-Yo Ma's Silk Road Project to compose Silk Road Reverie.

His 1950 revolutionary work Days of Emancipation (翻身的日子, Fānshēn de Rìzi; for banhu and Chinese orchestra) is well known in the West from its appearance on the 1981 CBS Masterworks compilation Phases of the Moon: Traditional Chinese Music.

Zhu died on August 15, 2017 in Shanghai.

List of major works

Orchestral:
节日序曲(Festival Overture), Op.10 (1958)
Symphony-Cantata:英雄的诗篇 (Poems of heroes), Op.14 (Original:1959 - 1960; First Edit:1964; Second Edit:1993)
Ballet Music:南海长城 (Great Wall beside the South China Sea) (1965)
怀念 (In Memoriam), for Strings, Op.18 (1978 - 1988)
交响幻想曲:纪念为真理献身的勇士 (Symphonic Fantasia:a Commemoration to the Brave sacrificed for verity), Op.21 (1980)
交响组曲:黔岭素描 (Symphonic Suites:Sketches of Mount.Qian), Op.23 (1982)
蝴蝶泉组曲:二胡与管弦乐队 (Suite for Erhu and Orchestra:Butterfly Spring), Op.24 (1983)
交响音诗:纳西一奇 (Symphonic Poem:Wonders of Na'xi), Op.25 (1984)
交响诗:百年沧桑 (Symphonic Poem:Vicissitude of a century) 
朱践耳 ZHU Jian-er Fishermen's Ballade, Suite No. 1 Op. 16 (1965/2003)
Symphonies:
Symphony No.1
Symphony No.2
Symphony No.3,"Tibet"
Symphony No.4,"6.4.2-1", for Dizi and Orchestra
Symphony No.5, for China Drum and Orchestra
Symphony No.6,"3Y", for Tapes and Orchestra
Symphony No.7,"天籟、地籟、人籟 (Sounds of paradise, earth and mankind)"
Symphony No.8,"求索 (Seek and Quest)", for 16 percussions and a Cello
Symphony No.9, for Boy Choir and Orchestra
Symphony No.10,"江雪 (Snow on river)", for Guqin (Tape), Chantrt (Tape) and Orchestra

Students
Wenchen Qin

External links
Zhu Jian'er page from Silk Road Project site

References

1922 births
2017 deaths
20th-century classical composers
Educators from Tianjin
Musicians from Tianjin
People's Republic of China composers
21st-century classical composers
Chinese classical composers
Chinese male classical composers
Chinese film score composers
Moscow Conservatory alumni
Academic staff of Shanghai Conservatory of Music
Male film score composers
20th-century male musicians
21st-century male musicians
Chinese expatriates in the Soviet Union